Felix Göttlicher (born 20 March 2002) is a German footballer who plays as a centre-back for Regionalliga Bayern club Würzburger Kickers, on loan from 3. Liga club Erzgebirge Aue.

Career

SpVgg Unterhaching
After playing youth football for FC Ingolstadt 04, Bayern Munich, FC Augsburg and JFG Neuburg, he joined SpVgg Unterhaching's academy in 2018. He joined VfB Eichstätt on loan in January 2020, but failed to make an appearance.

He made his senior debut for SpVgg Unterhaching on 28 November 2020 in a 2–1 victory over SV Wehen Wiesbaden.

On 14 January 2020, he was sent on a six-month loan to VfB Eichstätt.

Erzgebirge Aue
Göttlicher joined 3. Liga club Erzgebirge Aue on 12 April 2022, ahead of the 2022–23 season. He was sent on a one-season loan to recently relegated Regionalliga Bayern club Würzburger Kickers on 24 August 2022, before making any appearances for Aue.

References

2002 births
Living people
German footballers
Association football central defenders
SpVgg Unterhaching players
VfB Eichstätt players
FC Erzgebirge Aue players
Würzburger Kickers players
3. Liga players
Regionalliga players
21st-century German people